In Sikhism, a langar (pronunciation: , 'kitchen') is the community kitchen of a gurdwara, which serves meals to all free of charge, regardless of religion, caste, gender, economic status, or ethnicity.  People sit on the floor and eat together, and the kitchen is maintained and serviced by Sikh community volunteers. The meals served at a langar are always lacto-vegetarian.

Etymology 
Langar is a Persian word that was eventually incorporated into the Punjabi language and lexicon.<ref>Kathleen Seidel, Serving Love, Serving the Guest: A Sufi Cookbook", September 2000. Accessed 15 January 2010.</ref>

Origins

The concept of charity and providing cooked meals or uncooked raw material to ascetics and wandering yogis has been known in eastern cultures for over 2000 years. However, in spite of institutional support from several kings and emperors of the Delhi sultanate (up to the Mughal empire), it could not be institutionalized into a sustainable community kitchen, but continued as volunteer-run free food opportunities. Such distribution of free food was often limited to specific Hindu festivals or events at dargahs of Sufi saints. Exclusion of people based on castes and religion, further limited their outreach, which makes it questionable if they can be truly called 'community kitchens'. However, the community kitchen started by the Sikh Gurus, was universal and accepting of people from all faiths and backgrounds, a tradition which has continued to this day. The type of food served and the method of cooking employed, further helped make Sikh langar universally accepted by all faiths and castes.

Several writers such as Gurinder Singh Mann and Arvind-Pal Singh Mandair have alluded to this fact of cooked food (or raw material) being provided to travelers, ascetics and wandering yogis, free food distribution practices being in vogue in fifteenth century among various religious groups like Hindu Nath Yogis and Muslim Sufi saints. However, no evidence exists of formal institutionalized community kitchens, providing cooked free meals, continuously, over a period of time by any particular community.

The roots of such volunteer-run charitable feeding is very old in Indian tradition; for example: Hindu temples of the Gupta Empire era had attached kitchen and almshouse called dharma-shala or dharma-sattra to feed the travelers and poor, or whatever donation they may leave. These community kitchens and rest houses are evidenced in epigraphical evidence, and in some cases referred to as satram (for example, Annasya Satram), choultry, or chathram in parts of India. In fact, Sikh historian Kapur Singh refers to Langar as an Aryan institution. Such kitchens were limited to sangrand or masya or other specific festivals. Often, these kitchens precluded lower castes and hence it's questionable if they can be called 'community kitchens'. Due to the cooking practices of various religions and yogi orders, many would stay away from such 'free-meals'. For example, Hindus would not attend Muslim langars  and vice versa. However, the community kitchen started by the Sikh Gurus, was universal and accepting of people from all faiths and backgrounds, a tradition which has continued to this day.

The Chinese Buddhist pilgrim I Ching (7th century CE) wrote about monasteries with such volunteer-run kitchens. The institution of the Langar emerged from Fariduddin Ganjshakar, a Sufi Muslim saint living in the Punjab region during the 13th century. This concept further spread and is documented in Jawahir al-Faridi compiled in 1623 CE.

The concept of langar—which was designed to be upheld among all people, regardless of religion, caste, colour, creed, age, gender, or social status—was an innovative charity and symbol of equality introduced into Sikhism by its founder, Guru Nanak around 1500 CE in North Indian state of Punjab.

The second Guru of Sikhism, Guru Angad, is remembered in Sikh tradition for systematizing the institution of langar in all Sikh Gurdwara premises, where visitors from near and far could get a free simple meal in a simple and equal seating. He also set rules and training method for volunteers (sevadars'') who operated the kitchen, placing emphasis on treating it as a place of rest and refuge, and being always polite and hospitable to all visitors.

It was the third Guru, Guru Amar Das, who established langar as a prominent institution, and required people to dine together irrespective of their caste and class. He encouraged the practice of langar, and made all those who visited him attend langar before they could speak to him.

Contemporary practice

Langars are held in gurdwaras all over the world, most of which attract members of the homeless population. The volunteers feed people without any discrimination, alongside the Sikh devotees who gather. Almost all gurdwaras operate langars where local communities, sometimes consisting of hundreds or thousands of visitors, join for a simple lacto-vegetarian meal.

Gallery

See also
 Bhog
 Pangat
 Karah Parshad (Sikhism)
 Prasad (Hinduism)

Notes and references

External links

 

Punjabi words and phrases
Sikh practices
Sikh terminology
Vegetarian dishes of India
Free meals
Punjabi cuisine